Tan Wen-lin (born 26 August 1989), or 'Tan', is a Chinese female football player from Taiwan.

In April 27 2010, she passed Real Valladolid Femenino's tryout and signed with the Spanish club with compatriot Chen Xiao-juan, and became the second and third Chinese female football players from Taiwan contracted with Spainish club after Lin Man-ting. She also had a tryout for Chelsea football club in England, and signed a deal of 1000 euros a month.

Biography 
She studied in education Taiwan College of Physical Education. Tan Wen-lin National team

Chinese Taipei Football Player. 

Taiwan College of Physical Education

International goals

References

External links

1989 births
Living people
People from Hualien County
Taiwanese women's footballers
Women's association football forwards
Chinese Taipei women's international footballers
Asian Games competitors for Chinese Taipei
Footballers at the 2014 Asian Games
Taiwanese expatriate footballers
Taiwanese expatriates in Spain
Expatriate women's footballers in Spain